Akinfiyevo ( Russian: Акинфиево) – is a village in Nizhnyaya Salda urban district of Sverdlovsk Oblast. Population: 218

Geography 
The village is located in the centre of Sverdlovsk Oblast, 17 kilometres away from urban-type settlement of Nizhnyaya Salda, 170 kilometres away from Yekaterinburg.

History 
Akinfievo was founded in the end of 18th century by the Count Nikolai Nikitich Demidov. The inhabitants were engaged mainly in timber logging and extraction of stumps and delivered these materials to the Nizhnesaldinsky metallurgic plant. In addition, the main occupations were farming and animal husbandry.
By the 21st century the main activity of the population - agriculture - has changed. Now inhabitants work at the industrial enterprises, in the sphere of education and trade.

Population 
In 1843, there were 62 houses and 325 inhabitants in the village.
In 1970 - 474 people.
2010 - 240 people. 2011 - 218 people.

Remarkable sights 
 The obelisk to the participant of the Great Patriotic War
 The church of the Mother of God

References

Sources
  - The church of the Mother of God in Akinfievo (Russian)
   - Akinfievo, the selo (Russian)
  - The history of the selo

Cities and towns in Sverdlovsk Oblast